When formed in 1945, Córas Iompair Éireann (CIÉ) inherited a GSR wagon fleet insufficient for post-war requirements.   A major wagon building programme in the 1950s and 1960s eliminated this pre-war stock.  The new stock consisted of open or covered general purpose wagons of the four-wheel loose-coupled design, without vacuum brakes and limited to 35mph.  There were also a few specialised wagons built for tar, grain and cattle.

These vehicles were in turn superseded and phased out by the introduction of the intermodal fleet in the 1970s.  The new liner-trains, complete with vacuum brakes and Y25/Y27 bogies, enabled high speed (60 mph) transportation.

Today, all of Iarnród Éireann's freight stock is maintained at Limerick Colbert. Most of the company's withdrawn freight wagons are stored here as well, though some can be found at Heuston, North Wall Yard and Tralee. A large number of disused flat wagons are stored on disconnected sidings near the former Comhlucht Siuicre Eireann factory in Mallow.

Current freight flows 
 Lead and Zinc Ore from Tara Mines (Near Navan) to North Wall, Dublin
 Intermodal traffic between Ballina and North Wall, Dublin
 Intermodal traffic between Ballina Belview Port, Waterford
 Timber traffic between Westport/Ballina and Belview Port, Waterford

Freight listing

See also
 Coaching stock of Ireland
 Multiple units of Ireland
 Rail transport in Ireland
 Steam locomotives of Ireland

External links
 Eiretrains - Irish Locomotives

Iarnród Éireann
Rolling stock of Ireland
Rolling stock of Northern Ireland